The Volkswagen T-Cross is a subcompact crossover SUV (B-segment) manufactured by the German automaker Volkswagen. It is based on the MQB A0 platform shared with the Polo Mk6, and was officially launched in April 2019. Positioned below the T-Roc and alongside the Taigo/Nivus, it is the smallest SUV model from Volkswagen. It is also the second Volkswagen SUV model to sit in the B-SUV segment, after the T-Roc.

Overview 
The T-Cross started as a replacement for a cancelled project of a small SUV based on the Volkswagen Taigun concept which was showcased in São Paulo in 2012. It is an SUV based on the Volkswagen Up! with a length of under 3.9 m destined for Europe, Brazil and India, and was planned to be on sale in 2016 after the project was green-lit in 2012. In 2016, Volkswagen cancelled the plan of producing the Taigun after an internal study concluded that its dimension was too small. Volkswagen shifted its focus onto developing a Polo-based small SUV instead, which eventually spawned the T-Cross. The Taigun nameplate is being reused as a rebadged long-wheelbase T-Cross for the Indian market.

In 2016, the T-Cross was previewed as a concept car called the VW T-Cross Breeze at the Geneva Motor Show. This vehicle was, in contrast to the production version, a four-seater convertible with a fabric top.

The production version of the T-Cross was officially launched on 25 October 2018 simultaneously in three cities located in three continents – Amsterdam, Shanghai and São Paulo – demonstrating T-Cross's nature as a global product. The model is produced in China and Brazil with a modified length of 4.2 m and a longer wheelbase of 2.65 m shared with the Škoda Kamiq and Volkswagen Virtus, with the goal of improving interior space. These models also have different front fascias and steering wheels from the variant sold in Europe.

Markets

Europe 
Debuted in Amsterdam, the T-Cross is positioned below the T-Roc in Volkswagen Europe SUV line-up and acts as an entry-level model. The vehicle is built together with the Volkswagen Polo at Volkswagen Navarra S.A. in Pamplona, Spain.

Although the T-Cross is only slightly smaller than the Golf-based T-Roc, VW is marketing the T-Cross as the more practical and family-oriented car, as Volkswagen expects the T-Cross to appeal to young families and older demographics due to its tall roof and its high driving position.

It is available with a 5- or 6-speed manual, and a 7-speed DSG transmission. All T-Cross variants are front-wheel drive as its Polo-sourced underpinnings do not support an all-wheel drive configuration. It was delivered to the customers in April 2019.

The T-Cross went on sale in Turkey in March 2022.

T-Cross First Edition
It is available in 150 and 50 units in manual and dual-clutch gearboxes respectively, which were available as part of a lottery.

Powertrain

Safety 
The Euro NCAP has awarded the T-Cross a five-star rating. It scored 97% for adult occupant safety, 86% for child safety, 81% in the pedestrians and other vulnerable road users category and 80% for on-board safety tech. The T-Cross features several passive and active safety systems, including pedestrian and cyclist protection, automatic emergency braking, front assist and a speed limiter. High-end trim levels add several advanced features including adaptive cruise control, hill start assist and blind-spot monitoring.

Latin America

Brazil 
Unveiled on 25 October 2018 and sold from April 2019, the T-Cross built in São José dos Pinhais plant in Brazil is a long-wheelbase version one, sharing the 2.65 m wheelbase with the Virtus which stretches its length to 4.19 m while keeping it on the MQB A0 platform.

The Latin American T-Cross is available with several engine options, including 1.0-litre TSI making  used in the Brazil-made Polo and Virtus serving as an entry option, while the high-end trims is equipped with 1.4-litre TSI engine capable of  produced in São Carlos, São Paulo. It is available with a 6-speed manual transmission for the lowest trim, while the other trims solely available with a 6-speed torque converter automatic transmission. The Brazilian-made T-Cross used torsion beam for the rear suspension, sharing its suspension configuration with the Virtus with specific calibrations for an SUV model.

While the Brazilian-made T-Cross has a longer wheelbase compared to the European version, the engineering team focused on making a larger space and legroom for the second row passengers. As the result, the capacity of the boot was reduced. While the European T-Cross carries between 385 and 455 litres (rear seats unfolded, depends on the rear seat recline position), the Brazilian model is only capable of 373–420 litres. This is also the case for the Chinese T-Cross and Tacqua, being the long-wheelbase version of the T-Cross.

Mexico 
The T-Cross was introduced in Mexico in September 2019 and was imported from Brazil. It uses a 1.6-litre engine coupled with the Tiptronic six speed automatic transmission. It is the second car in Volkswagen's Mexican lineup to use the MQB A0 platform. It also comes with a 6.5" Composition Media and Apple CarPlay infotainment system, six airbags, ABS brakes and electronic stability control, and automatic post collision braking is available in all versions. It obtained a five star rating by Latin NCAP. It arrived to the market in Mexico in 2019.

The Brazilian-made T-Cross was briefly sold alongside the Indian-made Taigun, which went on sale in February 2023. The Taigun replaced the T-Cross in the market.

Powertrain

China 
In China, the car is offered by two manufacturers (SAIC-Volkswagen and FAW-Volkswagen) with two different names, which are the T-Cross and Tacqua respectively.

T-Cross 
The Chinese market T-Cross was unveiled on 25 October 2018. It is manufactured and marketed by SAIC-VW and adopted the long-wheelbase body like the Brazilian T-Cross. It features a different front and rear bumpers to adapt with the Chinese market taste and trends. It went on sale in April 2019.

Tacqua 
The twin model of the T-Cross for the Chinese market is named the Tacqua. Manufactured and marketed by FAW-VW, the Tacqua bears more resemblance with the Brazilian-made T-Cross in terms of exterior appearance, with the exception of the Tacqua R-Line model which is a new design. The Tacqua offers the same long-wheelbase body and engine options as the T-Cross built by SAIC-VW, which are 1.4-litre TSI and 1.5-litre MPI. It was unveiled in November 2019 and launched to the market in December 2019.

Powertrain 

† Marketed and labeled as such in China

India (Taigun) 

In February 2020, Volkswagen revealed the Taigun for the Indian market which is based from the Chinese market T-Cross with several changes, such as the redesigned C-pillar. It is unrelated to the concept model from 2012 with the same name. Volkswagen stated the Taigun is built on a modified MQB A0 platform dedicated for Indian market called the MQB A0 IN. It went on sale in India in September 2021.

Safety 

Volkswagen Taigun rated Adult And Child safety 5 star in Global NCAP.

Indonesia 
The T-Cross has been sold in Indonesia since 23 February 2022. Based on the Indian market Taigun, it is offered in a single variant with a 1.0-litre TSI engine.

Sales and production figures

References

External links

Official website (United Kingdom)

T-Cross
Cars introduced in 2018
Crossover sport utility vehicles
Front-wheel-drive vehicles
2010s cars
2020s cars
Mini sport utility vehicles
Euro NCAP small MPVs
Latin NCAP small MPVs
Cars of Brazil